Tokiwa Gozen (常盤御前) (1138 – c. 1180), or Lady Tokiwa, was a Japanese noblewoman of the late Heian period and mother of the great samurai general Minamoto no Yoshitsune. Sources disagree as to whether she was a concubine or wife to Minamoto no Yoshitomo, of which she bore Minamoto no Yoshitsune.  She was later captured by Taira no Kiyomori, but escaped.

After leaving Kiyomori, Tokiwa married Fujiwara no Naganari. She had children with him.

Lady Tokiwa is primarily associated, in literature and art, with an incident in which she fled through the snow, protecting her young son with her robes, during the Heiji Rebellion in 1160.

She is also known as Hotoke Gozen, or Lady Buddha.

See also

References

Frederic, Louis (2002). "Tokiwa Gozen." Japan Encyclopedia. Cambridge, Massachusetts: Harvard University Press.
Lane, Richard (1978). "Tokiwa Gozen." Images of the Floating World. Old Saybrook, CT: Konecky & Konecky.

1138 births
1180s deaths
Minamoto clan
Fujiwara clan
12th-century Japanese women